Michael D. Yates (born 1946) is an economist and a labor educator, and editorial director of the socialist publishing house Monthly Review Press.

He advocates a socialist view of economics.

Early life and education
Yates was born in a small coal mining town about 40 miles north of Pittsburgh, Pennsylvania. His grandmother worked on a barge boat as a cook and a servant for families in Manhattan, Newport and other wealthy enclaves. His immediate family had a long history working at dangerous, unhealthy jobs in the coal mines. At the age of 14, his mother took a job unloading dynamite at the entrance of the coal mines. His mother, uncle and grandmother all suffered from severe asthma from the dust generated by the mines. His father suffered emphysema from inhaling asbestos and silica dust at work.

Life for the Yates family was a difficult one, as it was for most working people. Yates' father worked in a large glass factory several miles away. The first Yates home did not have hot running water or an indoor toilet, and was owned by the mining company. When Michael was one year old, his parents moved the family to an old house on the farm of a family friend. There was now hot water but still no indoor plumbing.

A few years later, the family moved again, to a newly built house closer to the glass factory. Nearly every relative, neighbor and friend Yates knew, from the mining village to the factory town, was in the working class. He describes in this way in his book, Can the Working Class Change the World?

BY ANY IMAGINABLE DEFINITION of the working class, I was born into it. Almost every member of my extended family—parents, grandparents, uncles, aunts, and cousins—were wage laborers. They mined coal, hauled steel, made plate glass, labored on construction sites and as office secretaries, served the wealthy as domestic workers, clerked in company stores, cleaned offices and homes, took in laundry, cooked on tugboats, even unloaded trucks laden with dynamite. I joined the labor force at twelve and have been in it ever since, delivering newspapers, serving as a night watchman at a state park, doing clerical work in a factory, grading papers for a professor, selling life insurance, teaching in colleges and universities, arbitrating labor disputes, consulting for attorneys, desk clerking at a hotel, editing a magazine and books. I have spearheaded union organizing campaigns and helped in others. For more than thirty years, I taught workers in several labor studies programs, people in every imaginable occupation, from plumbers, bricklayers, postal employees, chemical workers, garment workers, and elevator operators to librarians, nurses, airline pilots, firefighters, and teachers. I once worked for the United Farm Workers Union, meeting campesinos and campesinas and helping them in legal disputes and collective bargaining.

Yates attended graduate school at the University of Pittsburgh (UP) from 1967 to 1973, although only the first two years were full-time.

Teaching and later career
In the summer of 1968, Yates received his induction notice. With the encouragement of an academic advisor, he applied for a teaching position at UP's satellite campus in Johnstown, Pennsylvania. He was appointed an assistant professor in 1969.  He worked part-time on his degree while teaching. Teaching deepened his radicalism, and he abandoned once and for all the neoclassical economics he had been taught. He also participated in union organizing activities, first with the maintenance and custodial workers on campus and then with the teachers.

Yates received his Ph.D. in economics from UP in 1976. He was given tenure by UP shortly after completing his doctorate. During a sabbatical leave in 1977, he served as director of research for the United Farm Workers Union at union headquarters in Keene, California. He left during a purge of union staff by union president Cesar Chavez. 

Although Yates continued to teach at UP-Johnstown, in 1980 he began to teach workers and labor activists as well.  He traveled all over the state of Pennsylvania and into West Virginia and Ohio, educating workers about labor unions, their right to form a union, and economics. He taught for many years in the Labor Center at the University of Massachusetts-Amherst, where his students were union officers and members.

Yates began a long-time relationship with Monthly Review in the mid-1970s. He has published many articles in the publication over the years.  The relationship between Yates and MR's editorial staff grew close.  Monthly Review Press eventually agreed to publish Yates' first book, Longer Hours, Fewer Jobs: Employment and Unemployment in the United States. Three more books and a co-edited volume followed. He also began to perform some editing work for the magazine.

During the mid-1980s Yates divorced his first wife and several years later married a second time. He has four children.

In 2001, Yates retired from his position at UP-Johnstown. He and his wife began to live an itinerant existence, spending significant amounts of time in Yellowstone National Park, Manhattan, Miami Beach and Portland, Oregon. These travels were documented in the book Cheap Motels and a Hotplate. As of 2019, he and his wife have been on the road for eighteen years.

After his retirement, Yates became in 2001 associate editor at Monthly Review. In 2006, he became the editorial director of Monthly Review Press. As director, he has edited more than fifty titles. In 2018, he retired as associate editor of Monthly Review.

Yates's last book, Can the Working Class Change the World? represents a synthesis of his more than fifty years of teaching, study, and activism. In it, he presents in clear language not only an analysis of capitalism but also an examination of the achievements and shortcomings of labor unions, social democratic political parties, and the socialism of the Soviet Union, China, Vietnam, and Cuba. He also posits the importance of race, patriarchy, and ecological catastrophe, and how each intersects with class. Unlike most books in this genre, this one takes a global perspective, with special attention paid to the Global South. And it does not shy away from forcefully advocating radical, democratic, and egalitarian changes in principles, education, agriculture, labor unions, and political parties, offering concrete examples in each case. In a review for Marx&Philosophy (https://marxandphilosophy.org.uk/reviews/18262_can-the-working-class-change-the-world-by-michael-d-yates-reviewed-by-lucia-morgans/), Lucia Morgans says this about the book: −		 
	
"It is no small feat to argue for the transformative power of a class whose members often act against their own objective interests and are wrought with seemingly insurmountable divisions. Nevertheless, in six carefully crafted chapters, Yates manages to achieve just this. In a format and style accessible to those in which he places his faith, he explains who the contemporary working class is, why it is capable of changing the world, its victories thus far and the challenges before it, and crucially, provides practical suggestions for its struggle against exploitation and expropriation."

Published works

Solely authored, co-authored, and edited works
Upward Struggle: A Bicentennial Tribute to Labor in Cambria and Somerset Counties (with Bruce Williams). Harrisburg, PA: Bicentennial Pennsylvania, 1976. ASIN: B0045VKCIU
A Labor Law Handbook. 1st ed. Cambridge, Mass.: South End Press, 1987. 
Longer Hours, Fewer Jobs: Employment and Unemployment in the United States. New York: Monthly Review Press, 1994. 
Power on the Job: The Legal Rights of Working People. Cambridge, Mass.: South End Press, 1994. 
Why Unions Matter. New York: Monthly Review Press, 1998. 
Naming the System: Inequality and Work in the Global Economy. New York: Monthly Review Press, 2003. 
Cheap Motels and a Hot Plate: An Economist's Travelogue. New York: Monthly Review Press, 2007. 
More Unequal: Aspects of Class in the United States. New York: Monthly Review Press, 2007. 
In and Out of the Working Class. Winnipeg: Arbeiter Ring Publishing, 2009. 
Why Unions Matter, 2nd edition. New York: Monthly Review Press, 2009.   
The ABCs of the Economic Crisis: What Working People Need to Know (with Fred Magdoff). New York: Monthly Review Press, 2009.  
Wisconsin Uprising: Labor Fights Back. New York: Monthly Review Press, 2012. 
A Freedom Budget for All Americans: Recapturing the Promise of the Civil Rights Movement in the Struggle for Economic Justice Today (with Paul Le Blanc). New York: Monthly  Review Press, 2013.   
The Great Inequality. London: Routledge, 2016.
 Can the Working Class Change the World. New York: Monthly Review Press, 2018. 
 Work Work Work: Labor, Alienation, and Class Struggle. New York: Monthly Review Press, 2022.

Co-edited works
Meiksins Wood, Ellen; Meiksins, Peter; and Yates, Michael D., eds. Rising from the Ashes?: Labor in the Age of "Global" Capitalism. New York: Monthly Review Press, 1998.

Notes

External links
Monthly Review Web site - Most of Yates' articles which have appeared in MR are available for reading on this site.
Cheap Motels and a Hot Plate  - Michael Yates's blog.

References
Stevenson, Paul. "Reviews/Comptes Rendus: Michael D. Yates, Naming the System: Inequality and Work in the Global Economy. " Labour/Le Travail. #55 (Spring 2005). 

1946 births
Living people
Economists from Pennsylvania
American magazine editors
American socialists
Labor historians
People from Ford City, Pennsylvania
University of Pittsburgh alumni
21st-century American economists